In differential geometry, a field in mathematics, a Poisson manifold is a smooth manifold endowed with a Poisson structure. The notion of Poisson manifold generalises that of symplectic manifold, which in turn generalises the phase space from Hamiltonian mechanics.

Poisson structures on manifolds were introduced by André Lichnerowicz in 1977 and are named after the French mathematician Siméon Denis Poisson, due to their early appearance in his works on analytical mechanics.

Introduction

From phase spaces of classical mechanics to symplectic and Poisson manifolds  

In classical mechanics, the phase space of a physical system consists of all the possible values of the position and of the momentum variables allowed by the system. It is naturally endowed with a Poisson bracket/symplectic form (see below), which allows one to formulate the Hamilton equations and describe the dynamics of the system through the phase space in time.

For instance, a single particle freely moving in the -dimensional Euclidean space (i.e. having  as configuration space) has phase space . The coordinates  describe respectively the positions and the generalised momenta. Such bracket satisfies the standard properties of a Lie bracket, plus a further compatibility with the product of functions, namely the Leibniz identity . Equivalently, the Poisson bracket on  can be reformulated using the symplectic form . Indeed, if one considers the Hamiltonian vector field  associated to a function , then the Poisson bracket can be rewritten as 

In more abstract differential geometric terms, the configuration space is an -dimensional smooth manifold , and the phase space is its cotangent bundle  (a manifold of dimension ). The latter is naturally equipped with a canonical symplectic form, which in canonical coordinates coincides with the one described above. Symplectic geometry is therefore the natural mathematical setting to describe classical Hamiltonian mechanics.

More precisely, a Poisson manifold consists of a smooth manifold  (not necessarily of even dimension) together with an abstract bracket , still called Poisson bracket, which does not necessarily arise from a symplectic form , but satisfies the same algebraic properties.

Poisson geometry is closely related to symplectic geometry: for instance every Poisson bracket determines a foliation of the manifold into symplectic submanifolds. However, the study of Poisson geometry requires techniques which are usually not employed in symplectic geometry, such as the theory of Lie groupoids and algebroids.

Moreover, there are natural examples of structures which should be "morally" symplectic, but exhibit singularities, i.e. their "symplectic form" should be allowed to be degenerate. For example, the smooth quotient of a symplectic manifold by a group acting by symplectomorphisms is a Poisson manifold, which is general is not symplectic. This situation models the case of a physical system which is invariant under symmetries: the “reduced” phase space, obtained quotienting the original phase space by the symmetries, in general is no longer symplectic, but is Poisson.

History 
Although the modern definition of Poisson manifold appeared only in the 70's-80's, its origin dates back to the nineteenth century. Alan Weinstein synthetised the early history of Poisson geometry as follows:"Poisson invented his brackets as a tool for classical dynamics. Jacobi realized the importance of these brackets and elucidated their algebraic properties, and Lie began the study of their geometry."

Indeed, Siméon Denis Poisson introduced in 1809 what we now call Poisson bracket in order to obtain new integrals of motion, i.e. quantities which are preserved throughout the motion. What will become known as Poisson's theorem can then be formulated asPoisson computations occupied many pages, and his results were rediscovered and simpliﬁed two decades later by Carl Gustav Jacob Jacobi. Jacobi was the ﬁrst to identify the general properties of the Poisson bracket as a binary operation. Moreover, he established the relation between the (Poisson) bracket of two functions and the (Lie) bracket of their associated Hamiltonian vector fields, i.e.in order to reformulate (and give a much shorter proof of) Poisson's theorem on integrals of motion.
Jacobi’s work on Poisson brackets inﬂuenced the pioneering studies of Sophus Lie on symmetries of diﬀerential equations, which led to the discovery of Lie groups and Lie algebras. For instance, what are now called linear Poisson structures (i.e. Poisson brackets on a vector space which send linear functions to linear functions) correspond precisely to Lie algebra structures. Moreover, the integrability of a linear Poisson structure (see below) is closely related to the integrability of its associated Lie algebra to a Lie group.

The twentieth century saw the development of modern differential geometry, but only in 1977 André Lichnerowicz introduced Poisson structures as geometric objects on smooth manifolds. Poisson manifolds were further studied in the foundational 1983 paper of Alan Weinstein, where many basic structure theorems were first proved.

These works exerted a huge influence in the subsequent decades on the development of Poisson geometry, which today is a field of its own, and at the same time is deeply entangled with e.g. non-commutative geometry, integrable systems, topological field theories and representation theory.

Formal definition
There are two main points of view to define Poisson structures: it is customary and convenient to switch between them.

As bracket 

 Skew symmetry: .
 Jacobi identity: .
 Leibniz's Rule: .

Choosing local coordinates , any Poisson bracket is given byfor  the Poisson bracket of the coordinate functions.

As bivector 
A Poisson bivector on a smooth manifold  is a bivector field  satisfying the non-linear partial differential equation , where 

denotes the Schouten–Nijenhuis bracket on multivector fields.

Equivalence of the definitions 
Let  be a bilinear skew-symmetric bracket (also called an almost Lie bracket) satisfying Leibniz's rule; then the function  can be described afor a unique smooth bivector field .

Then the following integrability conditions are equivalent:

  satisfies the Jacobi identity (hence it is a Poisson bracket);
  satisfies  (hence it a Poisson bivector);
 the map  is a Lie algebra homomorphism, i.e. the Hamiltonian vector fields satisfy ;
 the graph  defines a Dirac structure, i.e. a Lagrangian subbundle  which is closed under the standard Courant bracket.
A Poisson structure without any of the four requirements above is also called an almost Poisson structure.

Holomorphic Poisson structures 
The definition of Poisson structure for real smooth manifolds can be also adapted to the complex case.

A holomorphic Poisson manifold is a complex manifold  whose sheaf of holomorphic functions  is a sheaf of Poisson algebras. Equivalently, recall that a holomorphic bivector field  on a complex manifold  is a section  such that . Holomorphic Poisson manifolds can be characterised also in terms of Poisson-Nijenhuis structures.

Many results for real Poisson structures, e.g. regarding their integrability, extend also to holomorphic ones.

Holomorphic Poisson structures appear naturally in the context of generalised complex structures: locally, any generalised complex manifold is the product of a symplectic manifold and a holomorphic Poisson manifold.

Symplectic leaves

A Poisson manifold is naturally partitioned into regularly immersed symplectic manifolds of possibly different dimensions, called its symplectic leaves. These arise as the maximal integral submanifolds of the completely integrable singular foliation spanned by the Hamiltonian vector fields.

Rank of a Poisson structure 
Recall that any bivector field can be regarded as a skew homomorphism . The image  consists therefore of the values  of all Hamiltonian vector fields evaluated at every . 

Regular points form an open dense subspace ; when , i.e. the map  is of constant rank, the Poisson structure  is called regular. Examples of regular Poisson structures include trivial and nondegenerate structures (see below).

The regular case 
For a regular Poisson manifold, the image  is a regular distribution; it is easy to check that it is involutive, therefore, by Frobenius theorem,  admits a partition into leaves. Moreover, the Poisson bivector restricts nicely to each leaf, which become therefore symplectic manifolds.

The non-regular case 
For a non-regular Poisson manifold the situation is more complicated, since the distribution  is singular, i.e. the vector subspaces  have different dimensions.

Moreover, both the space  of regular points and its complement are saturated by symplectic leaves, so symplectic leaves may be either regular or singular.

Weinstein splitting theorem 
To show the existence of symplectic leaves also in the non-regular case, one can use Weinstein splitting theorem (or Darboux-Weinstein theorem). More precisely, if , there are local coordinates  such that the Poisson bivector  splits as the sumwhere .

Examples

Trivial Poisson structures 
Every manifold  carries the trivial Poisson structure , equivalently described by the bivector .

Nondegenerate Poisson structures 
A bivector field  is called nondegenerate if  is a vector bundle isomorphism. Nondegenerate Poisson bivector fields are actually the same thing as symplectic manifolds .

Furthermore,  is Poisson precisely if and only if  is closed; in such case, the bracket becomes the canonical Poisson bracket from Hamiltonian mechanics:Non-degenerate Poisson structures have only one symplectic leaf, namely  itself, and their Poisson algebra  become a Poisson ring.

Linear Poisson structures 
A Poisson structure  on a vector space  is called linear when the bracket of two linear functions is still linear.

The class of vector spaces with linear Poisson structures coincides actually with that of (dual of) Lie algebras. Indeed, the dual  of any finite-dimensional Lie algebra  carries a linear Poisson bracket, known in the literature under the names of Lie-Poisson, Kirillov-Poisson or KKS (Kostant-Kirillov-Souriau) structure:where  and the derivatives  are interpreted as elements of the bidual .

Conversely, any linear Poisson structure  on  must be of this form, i.e. there exists a natural Lie algebra structure induced on  whose Lie-Poisson bracket recovers .

Fibrewise linear Poisson structures 
The previous example can be generalised as follows. A Poisson structure on the total space of a vector bundle  is called fibrewise linear when the bracket of two smooth functions , whose restrictions to the fibres are linear, is still linear when restricted to the fibres. Equivalently, the Poisson bivector field  is asked to satisfy  for any , where  is the scalar multiplication .

The class of vector bundles with linear Poisson structures coincides actually with that of (dual of) Lie algebroids.

For  one recovers linear Poisson structures, while for  the fibrewise linear Poisson structure is the nondegenerate one given by the canonical symplectic structure of the cotangent bundle .

Other examples and constructions 

 Any constant bivector field on a vector space is automatically a Poisson structure; indeed, all three terms in the Jacobiator are zero, being the bracket with a constant function.
Any bivector field on a 2-dimensional manifold is automatically a Poisson structure; indeed,  is a 3-vector field, which is always zero in dimension 2.
Given any Poisson bivector field  on a 3-dimensional manifold , the bivector field , for any , is automatically Poisson.
Let  be a Lie group acting on a Poisson manifold  by Poisson diffeomorphisms.

Poisson cohomology 
The Poisson cohomology groups  of a Poisson manifold are the cohomology groups of the cochain complex

Using the morphism , one obtains a morphism from the de Rham complex  to the Poisson complex , inducing a group homomorphism . In the nondegenerate case, this becomes an isomorphism, so that the Poisson cohomology of a symplectic manifold fully recovers its de Rham cohomology. 

Poisson cohomology is difficult to compute in general, but the low degree groups contain important geometric information on the Poisson structure:  

  is the space of the Casimir functions, i.e. smooth functions Poisson-commuting with all others (or, equivalently, smooth functions constant on the symplectic leaves);
 is the space of Poisson vector fields modulo Hamiltonian vector fields;
  is the space of the infinitesimal deformations of the Poisson structure modulo trivial deformations;
  is the space of the obstructions to extend infinitesimal deformations to actual deformations.

Modular class 
The modular class of a Poisson manifold is a class in the first Poisson cohomology group, which is the obstruction to the existence of a volume form invariant under the Hamiltonian flows. It was introduced by Koszul and Weinstein.

The modular vector field of a Poisson manifold, with respect to a volume form , is the vector field  defined by the divergence of the Hamiltonian vector fields: .

The modular vector field is a Poisson 1-cocycle, i.e. it satisfies . Accordingly, the Poisson cohomology class  does not depend on the original choice of the volume form , and it is called the modular class of the Poisson manifold.

A Poisson manifold is called unimodular if its modular class vanishes. Notice that this happens if and only if there exists a volume form  such that the modular vector field  vanishes, i.e.  for every ; in other words,  is invariant under the flow of any Hamiltonian vector field. For instance:

 symplectic structures are always unimodular, since the Liouville form is invariant under all Hamiltonian vector fields;
Then  is unimodular as Poisson manifold if and only if it is unimodular as Lie algebra;
 For regular Poisson structures the modular class is related to the Reeb class of the underlying symplectic foliation (an element of the first leafwise cohomology group, which obstructs the existence of a volume normal form invariant by vector fields tangent to the foliation).

Poisson homology 
Poisson cohomology was introduced in 1977 by Lichnerowicz himself; a decade later, Brylinski introduced a homology theory for Poisson manifolds, using the operator .

Several results have been proved relating Poisson homology and cohomology. For instance, for orientable unimodular Poisson manifolds, Poisson homology turns out to be isomorphic to Poisson cohomology: this was proved independently by Xu and Evans-Lu-Weinstein.

Poisson maps
A smooth map  between Poisson manifolds is called a  if it respects the Poisson structures, i.e. one of the following equivalent conditions holds (compare with the equivalent definitions of Poisson structures above):

 the Poisson brackets  and  satisfy  for every  and smooth functions  

 the Hamiltonian vector fields associated to every smooth function  are -related, i.e. 
 the differential  is a Dirac morphism.

An anti-Poisson map satisfies analogous conditions with a minus sign on one side. 

Poisson manifolds are the objects of a category , with Poisson maps as morphisms. If a Poisson map  is also a diffeomorphism, then we call  a Poisson-diffeomorphism.

Examples 
 The inclusion mapping of a symplectic leaf, or of an open subspace, is a Poisson map.

One should notice that the notion of a Poisson map is fundamentally different from that of a symplectic map. For instance, with their standard symplectic structures, there exist no Poisson maps , whereas symplectic maps abound.

Symplectic realisations 
A symplectic realisation on a Poisson manifold M consists of a symplectic manifold  together with a Poisson map  which is a surjective submersion. Roughly speaking, the role of a symplectic realisation is to "desingularise" a complicated (degenerate) Poisson manifold by passing to a bigger, but easier (non-degenerate), one. 

Notice that some authors define symplectic realisations without this last condition (so that, for instance, the inclusion of a symplectic leaf in a symplectic manifold is an example) and call full a symplectic realisation where  is a surjective submersion. Examples of (full) symplectic realisations include the following:

 For the trivial Poisson structure , one takes as  the cotangent bundle , with its canonical symplectic structure, and as the projection .
 For a non-degenerate Poisson structure  one takes as  the manifold  itself and as  the identity .

A symplectic realisation  is called complete if, for any complete Hamiltonian vector field , the vector field  is complete as well. While symplectic realisations always exist for every Poisson manifold (and several different proofs are available), complete ones do not, and their existence plays a fundamental role in the integrability problem for Poisson manifolds (see below).

Integration of Poisson manifolds 
Any Poisson manifold  induces a structure of Lie algebroid on its cotangent bundle , also called the cotangent algebroid.

 the symplectic foliation is the usual (singular) foliation induced by the anchor of the Lie algebroid;
the symplectic leaves are the orbits of the Lie algebroid;
 the modular class of a Poisson manifold coincides with the modular class of the associated Lie algebroid .

It is of crucial importance to notice that the Lie algebroid  is not always integrable to a Lie groupoid.

Symplectic groupoids 
A  is a Lie groupoid  together with a symplectic form  which is also multiplicative, i.e. it satisfies the following algebraic compatibility with the groupoid multiplication: . The notion of symplectic groupoid was introduced at the end of the 80's independently by several authors.

A fundamental theorem states that the base space of any symplectic groupoid admits a unique Poisson structure  such that the source map  and the target map  are, respectively, a Poisson map and an anti-Poisson map. Moreover, the Lie algebroid  is isomorphic to the cotangent algebroid  associated to the Poisson manifold . Conversely, if the cotangent bundle  of a Poisson manifold is integrable to some Lie groupoid , then  is automatically a symplectic groupoid.

Accordingly, the integrability problem for a Poisson manifold consists in finding a (symplectic) Lie groupoid which integrates its cotangent algebroid; when this happens, the Poisson structure is called integrable.

While any Poisson manifold admits a local integration (i.e. a symplectic groupoid where the multiplication is defined only locally), there are general topological obstructions to its integrability, coming from the integrability theory for Lie algebroids. Using such obstructions, one can show that a Poisson manifold is integrable if and only if it admits a complete symplectic realisation.

Equivalently,  can be described as an infinite-dimensional symplectic quotient.

Examples of integrations 

 The trivial Poisson structure  is always integrable, the symplectic groupoid being the bundle of abelian (additive) groups  with the canonical symplectic form.

Submanifolds 

This definition is very natural and satisfies several good properties, e.g. the transverse intersection of two Poisson submanifolds is again a Poisson submanifold. However, it has also a few problems:

 Poisson submanifolds are rare: for instance, the only Poisson submanifolds of a symplectic manifold are the open sets;

In order to overcome these problems, one often uses the notion of a Poisson transversal (originally called cosymplectic submanifold). In the case of a nondegenerate Poisson manifold  (whose only symplectic leaf is  itself), Poisson transversals are the same thing as symplectic submanifolds.

More general classes of submanifolds play an important role in Poisson geometry, including Lie-Dirac submanifolds, Poisson-Dirac submanifolds, coisotropic submanifolds and pre-Poisson submanifolds.

See also
 Nambu-Poisson manifold
 Poisson–Lie group
 Poisson supermanifold
Kontsevich quantization formula

References

Books and surveys

 See also the review by Ping Xu in the Bulletin of the AMS.

Differential geometry
Symplectic geometry
Smooth manifolds
Structures on manifolds